Kiss This World Goodbye is a 1978 album by R&B group Mtume. This was their debut album on the Epic Records label as well as the first album featuring vocals by Tawatha Agee.

Track listing
All songs written by Reggie Lucas and James Mtume except where noted.
"Theme (for the People) [Opening]" (Tawatha Agee, Lucas, Mtume) – 1:30
"Just Funnin'" (Howard King, Lucas, Mtume) – 5:20
"Kiss This World Goodbye" – 3:58
"Insert" – 0:30
"The Closer I Get to You" – 3:58
"Love Lock" – 4:56
"Funky Constellation" – 4:05
"Closer to the End" – 4:32
"Metal Flake Mind" – 3:30
"Phase I" (Mtume; subtitled "40 Seconds dedicated to all Conga Players") – 0:42
"Day of the Reggin" – 3:31
"This Is Your World" – 3:28
"Theme (for the People) [Exit]" (Agee, Lucas, Mtume) – 0:48

Personnel
Mtume
James Mtume - lead and backing vocals, congas, percussion
Tawatha Agee - lead vocals, backing vocals
Reggie Lucas  - guitar
Basil Fearrington - bass
Hubert Eaves III - keyboards
Howard King - drums

Charts

Singles

References

External links
 Mtume-Kiss This World Goodbye  at Discogs

Mtume albums
1978 albums
Epic Records albums